Justice Wolcott may refer to:

Roger Wolcott (Connecticut politician) (1679–1767), chief justice of the Superior Court of Connecticut
Daniel F. Wolcott, associate justice of the Delaware Supreme Court
Erastus Wolcott (1722–1793), justice of the Connecticut Supreme Court of Errors (now known as the Connecticut Supreme Court)